Colin is a 2008 British zombie film written and directed by Marc Price. After a successful run in a number of film festivals, it went on to be shown at Cannes in 2009. Applauded for its success despite its low budget, the total cost of production was reportedly £45. The director, actor and comedian Marc Price, shot Colin on a standard definition Panasonic mini-dv camcorder that he had owned for 10 years and edited the film on his home PC using Adobe Premiere 6 software which had come bundled with a video capture card he'd purchased a few years earlier. Facebook and Myspace were used to gather actors to play the zombies.

Plot 
Injured in the arm, Colin arrives home to the house he shares with Damien only to find it empty. While cleaning his wound in the kitchen sink, he is attacked by Damien, now a zombie. He manages to "kill" Damien by stabbing him multiple times in the head with a kitchen knife, but soon afterward becomes a zombie himself. Now a zombie, Colin wanders the streets of London during the onset of a zombie apocalypse. He acquires the usual zombie cannibal taste for human flesh but avoids conflict. While being mugged for his trainers, he is seen by his sister Linda, who rescues him. That evening zombies invade a house party and kill everyone within. Colin follows the sole survivor of the carnage before she is trapped by a madman / serial killer in his basement with a group of blinded zombies.

Linda and a friend take Colin to their mother's house, but he cannot recognize them. Linda was bitten by Colin when she saved him from the muggers and turns into a zombie. She reanimates locked in the kitchen with Colin. In a fit of anger and grief, her boyfriend beats up (dead) Colin, who just shambles away.

The film also follows a group of human survivors who go on the offensive. Led by Slingshot Guy, the humans attack a large group of zombies with homemade weapons and a makeshift bomb. It explodes near Colin, destroying his hearing and most of his face. Three of the humans are bitten during the fight and plead for their lives before being brutally killed by the rest of the group because they will turn.

Colin finds his way to his friend Laura's home, where the film cuts to a flashback to when he was still human. Arriving at the house, he discovered that Laura had trapped a zombie in the bathroom. While attempting to kill the zombie, she was bitten and died in his arms, before reanimating and biting him. He then killed her before going home, which brings the viewer back to the film's beginning.

Cast

Production 
Colin is the first feature film to be told entirely from a zombie's perspective from the outset, the main character Colin changes in the first few minutes of the film. Another feature film that deals with a story from a zombie's point of view is Andrew Parkinson's I, Zombie (1998). Marc Price, the director of Colin, said that if he had known about the existence of I, Zombie, he probably wouldn't have made his film.  The film was shot in London using friends and professionals who worked free to build their portfolio.  Shooting took 18 months.

Soundtrack 
 Dan Weekes: "Colin's Theme"
 Spencer McGarry Season: "The Unfilmable Life and Life of Terry Gilliam"
 Jack Elphick: "Intro"; "Colin Broke My Keyboard"; "Boorman Lake"
 Simon Bevan: "RunAway" (acoustic)

Release

Screenings 
An early cut of the film was screened on 15 November 2008 at the Abertoir horror festival, where it drew the attention of sales agent Helen Grace of Left Films.

It then played at the Cannes film Market  and the Cannes Lions International Festival of Creativity, Saatchi & Saatchi presentation of new directors, 25 June 2009.

On 13 July 2009, the film had a special screening at Zombie-Aid in Manchester, with cast and crew present for Q & A.

On 27 July 2009, it was announced that the film would be distributed to cinemas and DVD by Kaleidoscope Home Entertainment (UK). A preview was shown during the Frightfest fantasy and horror film festival in London during August 2009. It was released in cinemas both in London and other major UK cities during Halloween.

During November 2009, it was shown during the 19th Málaga Fantastic Film Festival (Fancine) in Spain as part of the Horror Zone section.

During September 2010, Walking Shadows announced a release in the US.

DVD release 
It was released on DVD in October 2010 in the US. A two-disc Special Edition DVD has been released.

Reception 
Rotten Tomatoes, a review aggregator, reports that 46% of 26 surveyed critics gave the film a positive review; the average rating was 4.6/10.  Writing in Sight and Sound, Michael Brooke commended the film's ambiance of panic, assisted by the relative intimacy of a handheld camcorder as the principal instrument of filming. As a character, Colin is argued to be a sympathetic character despite his revenant status, comparable to Bub in Romero's Day of the Dead.  Nigel Floyd of Time Out London rated it 2/5 stars and called it an "overlong, non-frightening" film that "shambles fitfully from one scene to the next, without ever achieving any momentum or sense of direction."  Carmen Gray of Total Film rated the film 3/5 stars and wrote, "If a Credit Crunch Oscar existed, his DIY chutzpah would take the gong."  Phillip French of The Observer called it "confused, unoriginal and unimaginative".  Peter Bradshaw of The Guardian rated it 3/5 stars and called it "a ultra-minimal, ultra-experimental future-shock".  Joshua Siebalt of Dread Central rated it 3.5/5 stars and wrote, "For a first-time effort, Colin shows a helluva lot of promise."  Writing in The Zombie Movie Encyclopedia, Volume 2, academic Peter Dendle said, "No one will mistake the final product for polished art ... yet there is no question that Price offers a fresh, provocative approach to a zombie apocalypse."

See also 
 Zombie apocalypse
 List of zombie films

References

External links 
 
 
 

2008 films
2008 horror films
British horror films
British zombie films
Camcorder films
2000s English-language films
2000s British films